D800 may refer to:
 Nikon D800, a full-frame digital single-lens reflex camera
 Dell Latitude D800, a laptop computer
 Samsung D800, slider phone